The  is a traditional-style Japanese "sake-house" restaurant (izakaya) located in the city of Utsunomiya, north of Tokyo, Japan.

The tavern's owner, Kaoru Otsuka, owns two pet macaque monkeys who are currently employed to work at the location. The first monkey, twelve-year-old "Yat-chan", is dressed in a shirt and shorts while he takes customers' drink orders and delivers them to the diners' tables. The younger macaque, named Fuku-chan, is currently four years old and has the main duty of bringing the attendees hot towels to clean their hands before ordering drinks. Fuku-chan has only two years of experience, while Yat-chan has been reportedly performing the job for a longer time.

Both monkeys receive boiled soya beans from customers as tips for their service. The monkeys' environment has been inspected to ensure proper treatment of the animals; due to Japanese animal rights regulations, they are each only allowed to work for two hours a day. The restaurant was also featured as a reward for the winning team in the third episode of Season Two of I Survived a Japanese Game Show.

The tavern was abandoned after the 3/11 earthquake and tsunami. The monkeys still belong to the owner. The current state of the tavern and the monkeys was documented in a 2014 movie by artist Pierre Huyghe.

References

Restaurants in Japan
Drinking establishments in Asia
Food and drink companies of Japan
Japanese restaurants
Sake